The 1927–28 JBUs Mesterskabsrække was the 30th season of the Jutland Football Championship since its establishment in 1902. The season was launched in August 1927 and concluded in May 1928 with the final match of the regular league fixtures, while the championship play-offs and promotion/relegation play-off matches were held in May and June 1928. Aalborg BK won both final matches, securing their 4th Jutland league championship and qualifying for the 1928 Provinsmesterskabsturneringen, which they also won. Holstebro BK and BK Herning Fremad were relegated and replaced by Brønderslev IF and Haderslev FK from the 1927–28 JBUs A-række. In the 1927 JBUs Pokalturnering, Aalborg BK obtained their fourth consecutive cup championship, by winning the final against Esbjerg fB.

Teams

Stadia and locations

League table

Nordkredsen

Sydkredsen

Results

Championship play-offs 
The finals were contested on neutral venues between the winners of the North and South groups, Aalborg BK and Esbjerg fB. The winner qualified for the semi-finals of the 1928 Provinsmesterskabsturneringen.

Promotion/relegation play-offs 
Holstebro BK and BK Herning Fremad finished last in their respective groups and were relegated from the JBUs Mesterskabsrække after having lost in their respective promotion/relegation play-off matches against Brønderslev IF and Haderslev FK. Brønderslev IF had won the northern section of JBUs A-række, while Haderslev FK had won the southern section of JBUs A-række including winning the overall Jutland Championship Final of the JBUs A-Række at Randers on 17 June 1928. Both play-off matches were contested on neutral venues.

References 

1927–28
1
Denmark